Marco Ray Evoniuk (born September 30, 1957, in San Francisco, California) is a retired male race walker from the United States, who represented his native country at three consecutive Olympic Games, starting in 1984. Evoniuk had qualified for the 1980 U.S. Olympic team but was unable to compete due to the 1980 Summer Olympics boycott. He did however receive one of 461 Congressional Gold Medals created especially for the spurned athletes.

Personal bests
20 km: 1:25:23 hrs –  Copenhagen, 12 May 1984
50 km: 3:56:55 hrs –  Seoul, 30 September 1988

Achievements

References

External links

Racewalk.com bio

1957 births
Living people
American male racewalkers
Athletes (track and field) at the 1984 Summer Olympics
Athletes (track and field) at the 1988 Summer Olympics
Athletes (track and field) at the 1992 Summer Olympics
Athletes (track and field) at the 1979 Pan American Games
Athletes (track and field) at the 1983 Pan American Games
Athletes (track and field) at the 1991 Pan American Games
Olympic track and field athletes of the United States
Track and field athletes from San Francisco
Pan American Games medalists in athletics (track and field)
Pan American Games bronze medalists for the United States
Congressional Gold Medal recipients
Medalists at the 1979 Pan American Games